The American Journal of Bioethics is a monthly peer-reviewed academic journal published by Taylor & Francis, covering all aspects of bioethics. It publishes target articles, open peer commentaries, editorials, book reviews, and case studies and commentaries in clinical care and research ethics. The journal also publishes special issues that address timely ethical challenges. The editor-in-chief is David Magnus (Stanford University), who was also one of the journals founders.

The journal was established in 1999 by founding editor-in-chief Glenn McGee and David Magnus. It has produced independently managed journals on neuroscience and empirical bioethics as spin-offs.

bioethics.net
The journal is affiliated with bioethicstoday.org, also owned by Taylor & Francis, which publishes information on the latest journal publications, events, job opportunities, current news, and original blog content. The website is maintained by the editorial staff of the journal.

Abstracting and indexing 
The journal is abstracted and indexed in:

According to the Journal Citation Reports, the journal has a 2020 impact factor of 11.229, ranking it first out of 16 journals in the category "Medical Ethics", first out of 56 journals in the category "Ethics", second out of 44 journals in the category "Social Issues", and first out of 45 journals in the category "Social Sciences, Biomedical". The journal's 5 year impact factor is 8.552.

See also 
 List of bioethics journals
 List of ethics journals

References

External links
 
bioethics.net

Bioethics journals
Monthly journals
Taylor & Francis academic journals
English-language journals
Publications established in 1999
1999 establishments in the United States